Anna Bondár was the reigning champion, but chose not to participate.

Third seed Panna Udvardy won the title, defeating Danka Kovinić in the final, 6–4, 6–1.

Seeds

Draw

Finals

Top half

Bottom half

Qualifying

Seeds

Qualifiers

Lucky losers

Draw

First qualifier

Second qualifier

Third qualifier

Fourth qualifier

References

External Links
Main Draw
Qualifying Draw

WTA Argentina Open - Singles